The anhydroglucose unit (AGU) refers to a single sugar molecule in a polymer. Each AGU is reduced to its functional groups, 3 hydroxyl groups per AGU. 

Carbohydrate AGU:

Cellulose AGU:

See also
 Degree of polymerization

References

Carbohydrate chemistry